The scope for this page is that used for List of open-source mobile phones.

Mobiles expected to be in production

Mobiles currently in production

Mobiles no longer in production

See also 
 Comparison of mobile operating systems
 List of open-source mobile phones

References

Mobile Linux
Mobile phone standards
Lists of computer hardware
Open-source mobile phones
 
Open-source mobile phones